Top Dog is a character from the comic book of the same name, published by Star Comics (an imprint of Marvel Comics). Top Dog was created by writer Lennie Herman and artist Warren Kremer. The series lasted for 14 issues, published from 1985 to 1987.

The series
Top Dog is a very intelligent, talking dog who befriends a human child named Joey Jordan. Top Dog goes on to live with Joey, who promises not to expose the fact that Top Dog can speak. The duo go on to have adventures involving spies, criminals and mad scientists, after it is revealed that Top Dog was formerly "Mr. X", a government agent who was valued for his intelligence, but had to disguise his canine nature with a cover ID and a full-body cloak. Amongst these adventures were several crossovers with other Star Comic characters such as Heathcliff and Royal Roy. One story even seemingly involved a Spider-Man team-up. Although it was actually an actor in a Spider-Man suit, the real Peter Parker does make an appearance. The series ran for fourteen issues after which, the character continued to make appearances in Heathcliff comic books (starting in issue #22) in both crossovers and backup stories.

Top Dog reappeared in the 2009-2010 X-Babies miniseries Stars Reborn, as both a copy of himself produced by Mr. Veech to throw the X-Babies off his trail, and an Earth-616 version of himself, who happens to be a cyborg canine, rather than just an intelligent talking dog.

Titles

Top Dog
The titles of the main 14-issue Top Dog series:
"The Secret Life of Top Dog" (AKA "The Dog-Gone Beginning")
"Spies"
"Mad Biter"
"Top Dog's Secret Past is Revealed" (AKA "The Secret of Top Dog")
"Mr. Invisible"
"Frank N Stein"
"Special Team Up: Royal Roy and Top Dog" (AKA "Crisis in Cashalot") (featuring Royal Roy)
"The Strange Disappearance of Top Dog" (AKA "Missing")
"Special Team Up: Heathcliff and Top Dog" (AKA "The Mystery of the Missing Millions") (featuring Heathcliff)
"The Team Up of the Year: Can This be Spider-Man?" (AKA "The Spectacular Comic Book Caper!") (featuring Peter Parker and a Spider-Man lookalike)
"Enter: Dirty Dog" (AKA "The Return of Dirty Dog")
"The Revenge of Frank N Stein N Mervin"
"Front to the Future"
"Please Don't Go T-Top Dog!"

Heathcliff
The regular series continued in the back of Heathcliff comics starting with issue #22. Issue numbers #36, 40, 46 - 56 did not feature a Top Dog story. Issue #45 is one of Warren Kremer's last published stories after his paralyzing stroke in 1989 (the issue was published in March 1990):

Characters in the series
 Top Dog
 Joey Jordan
 Lizzie Jordan (Joey's sister)
 Mom Jordan
 Dad Jordan
 Mervin Megabucks
 Dirty Dog
 Frank and Stein
 Mr. Invisible

References

Fictional secret agents and spies in comics
Star Comics titles
Comics about dogs
Dog superheroes
1985 comics debuts
Comics characters introduced in 1985
Anthropomorphic dogs
Marvel Comics characters
Male characters in comics